Nick Fury, Agent of S.H.I.E.L.D. is a name used to refer to the character of Nick Fury while working for S.H.I.E.L.D., it can also refer to:

 Nick Fury, Agent of S.H.I.E.L.D. (comics), several comics
 Nick Fury, Agent of S.H.I.E.L.D. (comic book), a Marvel Comics title featuring the character
 Nick Fury, Agent of S.H.I.E.L.D. (feature), original Strange Tales feature for the title
 Nick Fury, Agent of S.H.I.E.L.D. (1968 series), first ongoing series for the character
 Nick Fury, Agent of S.H.I.E.L.D. (1989 series), second ongoing series for the character
 Nick Fury, Agent of S.H.I.E.L.D. (comic strip), Marvel Comics strip featuring the character
 Nick Fury: Agent of S.H.I.E.L.D. (film), the 1998 TV-movie based on the comic

See also
 List of S.H.I.E.L.D. members